Danis Ilgizovich Zubairov (born 7 March 2002) is a Russian football player.

Club career
He made his debut in the Russian Football National League for FC KAMAZ Naberezhnye Chelny on 19 September 2021 in a game against FC Neftekhimik Nizhnekamsk.

References

External links
 
 
 Profile by Russian Football National League

2002 births
Living people
Russian footballers
Association football midfielders
FC KAMAZ Naberezhnye Chelny players
Russian Second League players
Russian First League players